John Richard Clarke (April 4, 1927 – June 29, 2022) was a general authority of the Church of Jesus Christ of Latter-day Saints (LDS Church) from 1976 until his death. He has been a member of the church's presiding bishopric and a member of the Presidency of the Seventy.

Clarke was born in Rexburg, Idaho, to John R. and Nora Redford Clarke. Clarke graduated from Brigham Young University (BYU) in 1952. He worked in the insurance industry in his professional career.

LDS Church service
As a young man he served as an LDS Church missionary in South Africa. Prior to his call as a general authority, he served as a bishop, stake president, and regional representative in Idaho. He also returned to South Africa as the president of the church's South Africa Cape Town Mission.

In 1976, Clarke became the second counselor to presiding bishop Victor L. Brown. He served in this capacity until Brown was released in 1985. Clarke was retained as a general authority and became a member of the First Quorum of the Seventy. He became a member of the Presidency of the Seventy in 1988.  He served in that capacity until 1997 when he was released and given general authority emeritus status. In 2012 Clarke addressed the BYU student body at the weekly devotional.

From 1998 to 2001, Clarke was president of the LDS Church's Laie Hawaii Temple.

Personal life
Clarke married Barbara Jean Reed and are the parents of eight children.

References

External links
Elder J. Richard Clarke of the Presidency of the First Quorum of the Seventy

1927 births
2022 deaths
American Mormon missionaries in South Africa
Members of the First Quorum of the Seventy (LDS Church)
Mission presidents (LDS Church)
Temple presidents and matrons (LDS Church)
Regional representatives of the Twelve
20th-century Mormon missionaries
People from Rexburg, Idaho
Counselors in the Presiding Bishopric (LDS Church)
Presidents of the Seventy (LDS Church)
American general authorities (LDS Church)
Religious leaders from Idaho
Latter Day Saints from Idaho